Two athletes from Latvia competed at the 1932 Summer Olympics in Los Angeles, California, in the United States.

Medalists

Athletics

Men
Track & road events

Combined events – Decathlon

Art competitions

Nations at the 1932 Summer Olympics
1932
1932 in Latvian sport